Fabien Barcella (born 27 October 1983, in Agen) is a French rugby union player, currently playing for FC Grenoble in the Top 14 league in France. He also plays for France.

Domestic Clubs 
Barcella played for Toulouse before joining Valence-d'Agen in 2005. He then went on to play for Auch between 2006 and 2008. In 2008 he joined Biarritz Olympique where he made his Heineken Cup debut.

International Selection 
In 2008 French coach Marc Lievremont sprung a surprise when he called up Barcella for the 2008 Six Nations Championship match against Italy at the Stade de France. He was also called up to the Wales game a week later. He featured again in the Autumn against Argentina.
During the 2009 Six Nations Championship, he was in competition with Sale prop Lionel Faure for the starting job, which he obtained, making big performances. He played at the 2011 Rugby World Cup squad in New Zealand.

He was later called for test matches against New Zealand and Australia in June, where he made a number of standout performances. Barcella is often seen as one of the best loose head props in the world, his ability to destroy his opposite number in the scrum and cause havoc around the pitch with his brute aggression often sets him apart from his peers.

Notes

Sportspeople from Agen
Living people
1983 births
French rugby union players
Rugby union props
Stade Toulousain players
Biarritz Olympique players
RC Toulonnais players
French people of Italian descent
France international rugby union players